The AN/TPQ-2 Close Air Support System was a post-World War II radar/computer/communications system ("Q" system) for automatically tracking an aircraft and guiding it to a predetermined bomb release point.  The system was the predecessor of the General Electric AN/MPQ-14 Course Directing Central deployed to the Korean War for ground-directed bombing.

Background
After the Air Medal was awarded for development of ground-directed bombing in Italy for World War II Close Air Support, a detachment of NAS Mojave's "Pilotless Aircraft Unit" was established in 1945 on a SeaBee military installation at Point Mugu (4 officers and 11 enlisted men).  A Bureau of Aeronautics committee's December 1945 Study of the Requirements for Pilotless Aircraft for Fleet Use in 1950 was approved 3 months later, and the KGW-1 Loon was 1 of its 18 missile proposals.  The detachment's "Marine LtCol Marion Dalby and Dr. Herbert Wagner", the latter arriving by Operation Paperclip in early 1946, developed "NAVAIR’s TPQ-2 Close Air Support System" for command guidance of the KGW-1 Loon missile for submarine attacks on mapped Japanese "beach-head fortifications".   Point Mugu development of the KGW-1 and its test launch facilities were by "Jack Schoenhair's gang" and included additional Operation Paperclip scientists "Willy Fiedler, Robert Lusser and Otto Schwede".  The 1st KGW-1 launch was in January 1946, and its 1st submarine launch was February 12, 1947, using rocket assist developed by Robert Truax's team.

Description
The transportable AN/TPQ-2 included a World War II surplus SCR-584 radar and, as in the AN/MSQ-1, a Reeves Instrument Corporation analog computer for converting the radar's spherical coordinates to rectangular coordinates, and a Reeves "plotting board to yield course changes, a warhead arming signal and a dump [dive] command to the Loon".   A "Marine F6F fighter" was to escort the KGW-1 for safety (e.g., to abort by shooting a missile straying back over land) and during simulated KGW-1 missions, MSgt. Clark. D Hayden used the system to instead control the manned fighter.   During Dalby's 2nd mission piloting a "Loon simulation flight" he "wondered why…prefer [sub-launched, 1,000 lb payload] Loon over a two thousand lb. Bomb” from a piloted aircraft launched by a carrier.  Dalby briefed Point Mugu's Director of Tests, Captain Grayson Merrill, when "both realized…we were talking about [an] all-weather, close-air support system" and "Dalby and I conceived the idea of converting [its use to] Close Air Support."
Dalby and Cpt. Samuel A. Dressin redesigned  the system (e.g., switched from the SCR-584 to the SCR-784 radar), and the TPQ-2 was demonstrated at Camp Pendelton in April 1950.  Dalby claimed dummy bombs from  would drop within  of the target, and a direct hit on a terrain feature was observed by the 1st Marine Air Wing Chief of Staff.  Lt. Col. Homer G. Hutchinson helped the project receive support including two F4U night-fighters and pilots for training.

References

Cold War military computer systems of the United States
Cold War military radars of the United States
United States Marine Corps equipment
Military equipment introduced from 1945 to 1949